Gabriel Arcanjo Ferreira da Costa (born 1954) is a Santoméan politician who was the tenth prime minister of São Tomé and Príncipe from 12 December 2012 to 25 November 2014. He previously served as Prime Minister briefly in 2002.

Prime Minister
Costa was Ambassador to Portugal from 2000 to 2002. He was appointed as Prime Minister to lead a coalition government in April 2002. However, he was sacked from that post on 27 September 2002 by President Fradique de Menezes after army unrest over two controversial promotions.

On 3 December 2012, he was again appointed as Prime Minister by President Manuel Pinto da Costa, following the dismissal of Patrice Trovoada, who had lost his parliamentary majority.

References

|-

1954 births
Government ministers of São Tomé and Príncipe
Living people
Movement for the Liberation of São Tomé and Príncipe/Social Democratic Party politicians
Ambassadors of São Tomé and Príncipe to Portugal
21st-century São Tomé and Príncipe politicians
Prime Ministers of São Tomé and Príncipe